Anguri also spelled as Angoori or Angori is a settlement in Jaghori district of Ghazni province in Afghanistan.

History
In the 1980s-1990s, Anguri was a flashpoint for ethnic violence between Hazara and Pashtun communities. Due to the area's large Hazara population it has been neglected by the predominantly Pashtun central government in Kabul and targeted by Taliban attacks during the War in Afghanistan.

Economy
Bazar Anguri is a market town for people in the Jaghori District. Anguri's bazar has developed in the last decade and has many new markets, shops and stores.

Geography 
Anguri shares borders with Sang-e-Shanda and Baderzar to the north, and Dawod Zeerak to the north east and Bilaw to the east.
Hutqol is located west of Anguri and there is bal na koh mountains in north-west of anguri. The alghizar valley is in the south which reaches down to Gelan province.

Education
There are three state high school in Anguri (Hootqul-Anguri High-school ليسه حتقول و انگوري, Anguri Girls high-school لیسه نسوان انگوری, Ustad Fazil high-school لیسه استاد فاضل), one private high-school (Keyan Private high-school لیسه خصوصی کیان) and Nigina educational center. The high school was established in 1956.. There hundreds of girls and boys graduating from high-schools and joining universities for tertiary education in Kabul and other provinces. Many of these students coming back after graduation from university and begin teaching in high-schools.

See also
 Jaghori District
 Ghazni Province
Education in Anguri, there are three state high-schools (Hotqul-Anguri Highschool لیسه عالی حوتقول انگوریو, Anguri Girls highschool لیسه نسوان انگوری, Oustad Fazil High-school لیسه استاد فاضل), one private high-school (Keyan Private high-school لیسه خصوصی کیانو, and Negina institute.  hundreds girls and boys graduate from high-schools each year and continuing tertiary education in universities. Many girls and boys are coming back after graduation from universities and teaching in high-schools.

References

Jaghori District
Populated places in Ghazni Province
Hazarajat